The Obudu Ranch International Mountain Race is an annual 11.25 km mountain running competition that takes place in late November in Obudu, Cross River State, Nigeria. First held in 2005, it has the largest total prize money available of any mountain race and is known as "the world's richest mountain race". The men's and women's competition winners receive US$50,000 each, and there is a total prize pot of around $250,000.

The combination of the distance of the race and the rewards on offer means that it attracts world-class road running athletes as well as mountain running athletes. It is an associate member race of the World Mountain Running Association (WMRA) and is also endorsed by the International Association of Athletics Federations (IAAF).

The race was created under the patronage of Donald Duke, the former Governor of Cross River State, who devised it as a means of raising awareness of Obudu Cattle Ranch – a tourist resort. The course begins at a height of 800 m above sea level, and as it traces a path towards the summit of Mount Obudu it climbs a further 800 m, with the finishing point of the race being a total 1600 m above sea level.

The inaugural edition in 2005, the first ever professional mountain running race to be held in the country, mainly comprised Nigerian runners and a select group of invited professional mountain runners. The following two editions saw prominent mountain runners mix with established road runners for the first time: Stockholm Marathon winner Rita Jeptoo took the women's 2007 title. The women's race at the 2008 edition demonstrated the advantages of mountain running experience as Mestawet Tufa, that year's World Cross Country silver medallist, built up a large lead but struggled with the incline near the finish. She was overtaken by Mountain Running World Champion Andrea Mayr, who set a new course record, while Tufa collapsed and failed to finish just 50 m from the line.

For the 2009 race, WMRA president Danny Hughes and Liyel Imoke (the new Cross River State governor) decided to inaugurate the first men's African Mountain Running Championships as part of the Obudu Mountain race. Habtamu Fikadu was elected as the first African Mountain Running champion, Geoffrey Kusuro took silver and Abebe Dinkesa won bronze. In the team competition, Ethiopia won while Uganda and hosts Nigeria won the minor medals.

Past senior race winners

Key:

References

External links
Official website
2009 race report from IAAF

Mountain running competitions
Sports competitions in Nigeria
Recurring sporting events established in 2005
Athletics competitions in Nigeria
2005 establishments in Nigeria
Annual sporting events in Nigeria
Cross River State